Accident is a 2012 Bengali film directed by Nandita Roy & Shiboprosad Mukherjee. The story of the film deals with road accident and its consequences in Kolkata. The director duo got motivated by Keshtopur road incident in April 2008 where at least 20 people were killed and nearly 40 were injured.

Plot synopsis
Arko, an aspiring bowler, wants to pursue his career in cricket. However, a torn ligament puts an end to his dreams. He tries his luck in various other jobs, but all in vain. Frustration and depression continue to take a toll on him. Then, suddenly, life starts looking up after the birth of his son, Babai. While Arko stays at home and takes care of Babai, his wife, Riya, goes out to work. On the other hand, Kartik Mondol is a poor bus driver, who lives in a slum with his mother and wife and drives the buses owned by Madan Patra. Then, there is Swapan Chakraborty, an honest insurance investigator, who lives with his daughter and specially abled father.
One morning, while Babai is going to school, he meets with an accident. Kartik's bus runs over little Babai, killing him. Arko's life is shattered. Though Kartik is arrested, he is made a scapegoat for the greater negligence by bus owners, the testing centres, and the corporate giant, Axle Motors. Swapan, who takes up the case, finds that the bus itself is a defective model. After obtaining bail, Kartik teams up with Arko and Swapan. Their protest, overcoming all difficulties, constitutes the main plot of the movie.

Crash roster
	3 November 2007: Five schoolchildren and two others were injured after a Delhi Public School (DPS) bus collided with a milk van on VIP Road near the Lake Town intersection
	5 October 2007: Three persons were killed and two severely injured when a Matador van collided with a trailer near Kaikhali crossing
	4 February 2007: A car carrying three air hostesses of a private airline was hit from behind by a bus that tried to overtake another near Baguiati. The car fell into a ditch and was badly damaged. The air hostesses and their driver were injured and admitted to a nursing home
	31 March 2008: Three people, including a child, were injured when their taxi turned turtle on VIP Road. All three were rushed to a private nursing home, where they were admitted with serious injuries
	4 April 2008: A bus plunged into Kestopur canal, killing 21 passengers on board
	10 April 2008: A commuter, hit by a taxi near the 4 April accident spot, died
	2 June 2008: A speeding minibus brushed past a Digha-Barasat government bus on the airport-bound flank of VIP Road near Golaghata. An iron rod jutting out of the minibus perforated the metal body of the government bus and pierced a passenger. Near Baguiati, passengers noticed the man bleeding profusely. He was rushed to RG Kar hospital, where he was declared brought dead
	8 June 2008: A 54-year-old man was run over by a speeding minibus at Haldiram junction of VIP Road 
 	17 June 2008: A man was slowly crushed to death under an overturned vehicle on VIP Road. His 8-year-old son, trembling, kept pleading for an hour. No one helped
	30 June 2008: A speeding bus knocked down a middle-aged woman at the Baguiati junction of VIP Road. The bus on route 30C/1 managed to flee. The woman, who was identified as Reena, was rushed to a local nursing home, where she was declared brought dead.
	30 October 2009: 25-year-old Masum Minhuj, a software engineer who was happily settled in Belgium chose to fly down and make Kolkata his home. The techie met his end while biking down VIP road for a job interview at Sector V, a journey that was cut short when he took a hit from a mini bus, whose driver cared two hoots for road safety. Commuters blamed slack traffic policing for the frequent accidents and deaths on the corridor. 
	18 September 2011: A 47-year-old woman was killed and her son was critically injured after a private bus rammed into their motorbike on VIP Road at Kestopur near Baguiati. The driver of the killer bus was arrested. The driver of a speeding bus on the Gorabazar-Babughat route suddenly lost control and hit the bike from behind.

Cast
 Rudranil Ghosh as Kartik Mondol (Bus driver)
 Shiboprosad Mukherjee as Arko
 Sabyasachi Chakrabarty as Amit Durjari (chairman of Axle Motors)
 Sampurna Lahiri as Riya
 Kanchan Mullick as Makal (bus conductor)
 Debshankar Haldar as Swapan Chakraborty (Insurance Agent)
 Sankarshan Das as Babai (Arko and Riya's son)
 Kanchana Moitra as Rumki (Kartik's wife)
 Kharaj Mukherjee as Madan Patra (Bus Owner)
 Biswanath Basu as Raj Da (bus servicing agent)
 Chitra Sen as Kartik's mother 
 Biswajit Chakraborty as Transport Minister 
 Dibya Bhattacharya as Swapan's father
 Arindol Bagchi

Crew 
 Story, Script, Dialogue & Direction: Nandita Roy & Shiboprosad Mukherjee
 Produced by: Kaustuv Ray
 Presented by: Shibaji Panja
 Lyrics by: Srijato
 Music by: Joy Sarkar

Music

Direction 
Nandita Roy is an Indian filmmaker, screenplay writer and producer. She has been working in the film industry for the past 30 years. She has worked in many television serials and National Award-winning films. Shiboprosad Mukherjee is an Indian filmmaker, actor and producer. He started his acting career by joining the Theatre in Education Project and was a regular theatre artiste at Nandikar. He learnt his art from celebrated thespians like Rudraprasad Sengupta and Ibrahim Alkazi. 
The director duo ventured into cinema in 2011, with their first film, Icche. From then on, they have co-directed films like Accident (2012), Muktodhara (2012), Alik Sukh (2013), Ramdhanu (2014), Belaseshe (2015), Praktan (2016) Posto (2017), Haami (2018), Konttho (2019), Gotro (2019), which have been critically acclaimed and commercially successful. Their films have been appreciated for their socially relevant content and entertaining narrative structure.

Response
Accident ran successfully in theatres for 50 days. The film was selected for the Indian Cinema Now section of the 18th International Kerala Film Festival. Later in 2012, Joy Sarkar won the Best Singer award for the soundtrack 'Janejaan' from this film at the Radio Mirchi Awards.

See also 
 Muktodhara
 Icche
 Ramdhanu
 Alik Sukh

References 

2012 films
Bengali-language Indian films
2010s Bengali-language films
Films directed by Nandita Roy and Shiboprosad Mukherjee